Don Ellersick (May 7, 1938 – June 13, 1996) was an American football defensive back. He played for the Los Angeles Rams in 1960.

References

1938 births
1996 deaths
American football defensive backs
Washington State Cougars football players
Los Angeles Rams players